The Old Town Historic District is a  historic district in Selma, Dallas County, Alabama.  It is bounded by U.S. Route 80, Broad and Franklin streets, and Dallas and Selma avenues.  The boundaries were increased on December 15, 2003.  The district includes examples of the Federal, Greek Revival, Italianate, Gothic Revival, Victorian, Shotgun, Queen Anne, Romanesque Revival, Renaissance Revival, and Classical Revival.  It contains 629 properties, with 513 contributing and 116 noncontributing to the district.  It was added to the National Register of Historic Places on May 3, 1978.

 
Dallas Academy was a private school in Selma, Alabama (Dallas County, Alabama). The school building was constructed ca. 1889 and it is a contributing property to the Old Town Historic District.

References

National Register of Historic Places in Dallas County, Alabama
Historic districts in Dallas County, Alabama
Historic districts on the National Register of Historic Places in Alabama